A New Covenant was a political slogan used by U.S. President Bill Clinton to describe his political philosophy and agenda. The term was used sporadically during the 1992 campaign and Clinton's terms in office to describe a "new social compact" between the United States Government and its citizens. 

In speech to the Democratic Leadership Council in May 1991, Clinton used the slogan "New Choice". He started publicly using the phrase "New Covenant" when he announced his candidacy for the Democratic Party's nomination on October 3, 1991. The phrase has been attributed to Clinton advisor William Galston.

Georgetown University speeches 
A New Covenant was the theme of a series of speeches given by then-Governor Bill Clinton at his alma mater, Georgetown University, in late 1991 to outline his political philosophy at the start of his campaign for the presidency. In these talks, the "New Covenant" referred to both domestic and foreign policy. The titles of the speeches were "The New Covenant: Responsibility and Rebuilding the American Community" (October 23, 1991), "A New Covenant for Economic Change" (November 20, 1991), and "A New Covenant for American Security" (December 12, 1991).

Acceptance speech to the 1992 Democratic National Convention 
Clinton repeatedly used the phrase "New Covenant" in his acceptance speech to the 1992 Democratic National Convention to describe economic, health care, minority rights, tax, and defense issues. He also said it was "a new approach to government. A government that offers more empowerment and less entitlement; more choices for young people in public schools and more choices for older people in long-term care. A government that is leaner, not meaner; that expands opportunity, not bureaucracy; that understands that jobs must come from growth in a vibrant and vital system of free enterprise." The term was also used in the party's 1992 platform.

1995 State of the Union Address 
After the Republican Party gained control of Congress in 1994, Clinton returned to the New Covenant theme in his 1995 State of the Union Address, but reframed the philosophy as a centrist approach that included smaller government, tax reductions, and less bureaucracy. Conservative William Kristol called the address the "most conservative State of the Union by a Democratic president in history." In the speech, Clinton narrowed the New Covenant to domestic policy and focused on "opportunity and responsibility" to describe his proposals on his legislative agenda, such as welfare reform.
I call it the New Covenant. But it's grounded in a very, very old idea -- that all Americans have not just a right, but a solid responsibility to rise as far as their God-given talents and determination can take them; and to give something back to their communities and their country in return. Opportunity and responsibility: They go hand in hand. We can't have one without the other. And our national community can't hold together without both.
...
Our New Covenant is a new set of understandings for how we can equip our people to meet the challenges of a new economy, how we can change the way our government works to fit a different time, and, above all, how we can repair the damaged bonds in our society and come together behind our common purpose. We must have dramatic change in our economy, our government and ourselves.

Commentary 
Clinton's call for a "New Covenant"  was seen as saying that the 12 previous years under Presidents Ronald Reagan and George H. W. Bush represented a breaking of the traditional relationship between the American people and their government, presumably because of the close relationship between leaders in those administrations and "big business" interests, as opposed to traditional Democratic constituencies such as labor unions, women's groups, and minority group members.  Clinton apparently hoped that this term would come to be used to describe the policies adopted by his administration.

The term was never widely adopted, and thus is not as widely associated with Clinton and his policies as is the Square Deal with Theodore Roosevelt, the New Deal with Franklin D. Roosevelt, the Fair Deal with Harry S. Truman, the New Frontier with John F. Kennedy, or the Great Society with Lyndon Johnson.

The term had distinctly Christian connotations deriving from the New Covenant of the Bible.

References

Clinton administration initiatives
United States presidential domestic programs